Terence Frederick Venables (born 6 January 1943), often referred to as El Tel, is an English former football player and manager, and an author. During the 1960s and '70s, he played for various clubs including Chelsea, Tottenham Hotspur and Queens Park Rangers, and gained two caps for England.

As a club manager, Venables won the Second Division championship with Crystal Palace in 1979. He reached the 1982 FA Cup Final with Queens Park Rangers and won the Second Division in 1983. With Barcelona, he won La Liga in 1985 and reached the 1986 European Cup Final. He guided Tottenham Hotspur to FA Cup victory in 1991. He also managed Middlesbrough and Leeds United. As the England national team manager from 1994 to 1996, he reached the semi-finals of the 1996 European Championships, and managed Australia from 1997 to 1998.

Childhood

Terence Frederick Venables was born in Dagenham on 6 January 1943, the only child of Fred and Myrtle Venables. His father was a Navy petty officer who originally came from Barking. His mother was Welsh, and her family lived in Clydach Vale. When he was 13, his parents moved to run a pub in Romford, Essex, sending him to live with his maternal grandparents Ossie and Milly, who fostered his love of football.

Club career
Venables progressed from representing his county to earning caps for England Schoolboys, and attracted interest from Chelsea, Tottenham Hotspur, West Ham United, and Manchester United.

Chelsea
Venables left school in the summer of 1958 and signed for Chelsea as an apprentice at the age of 15. He later said that he joined Chelsea as he felt he had a better chance of breaking into the first team at Stamford Bridge, and also because the club offered his father a job as a part-time scout, and he denied West Ham's youth coach Malcolm Allison's claim that he had only joined Chelsea for financial reasons. He delayed becoming a professional player so he could try for a place on the Great Britain squad for the 1960 Summer Olympics, and turned professional after learning that he would not be selected for the squad. He won the FA Youth Cup with Chelsea in consecutive seasons, as they beat Preston North End in 1960 and Everton in 1961. He made his much anticipated senior debut in a 4–2 defeat to West Ham United on 6 February 1960, with newspapers billing him as "the new Duncan Edwards".

Tommy Docherty joined Chelsea as player-coach in September 1961, and went on to replace Ted Drake as manager the following month. Docherty proved to be a successful manager at the club, promoting younger players who became known as "Docherty's Diamonds", and was a highly influential coach in Venables' career. However the pair had a difficult relationship, and Venables believed Docherty to be tactically limited. Chelsea were relegated at the end of the 1961–62 season, but managed to gain promotion out of the Second Division at the first attempt with a second-place finish in 1962–63. They went on to finish fifth in the First Division in the 1963–64 season. He took his FA coaching badges at the age of 24, passing with distinction and a 95% pass mark.

He went on to lift the League Cup with Chelsea, and scored a penalty against Leicester City in the two-legged final. Chelsea also reached the semi-finals of the FA Cup in 1964–65, where they were knocked out by Liverpool. With three games left to play they were also in with an outside chance of overtaking Manchester United and Leeds United to win the league title, but Chelsea lost the first of these games 2–0 to Liverpool at Anfield. Docherty reversed his decision to allow the players a night out after the game, but Venables and seven other players (George Graham, Barry Bridges, John Hollins, Marvin Hinton, Eddie McCreadie, Joe Fascione, and Bert Murray) broke curfew and went for a brief night out. Upon their return to the team hotel Docherty suspended all eight players for the remainder of the season. Chelsea then lost 6–2 to Burnley, before Docherty reinstated the players for a final day defeat to Blackpool. Venables never forgave Docherty for the punishment, describing it as "crass, stupid and self-defeating". Docherty placed Venables on the transfer list towards the end of the 1965–66, with Chelsea again heading towards a fifth-place finish.

Tottenham Hotspur
Venables was signed by Tottenham Hotspur for a fee of £80,000, and made his debut for the club in a 1–0 win at Blackburn Rovers on May 9, 1966. He soon made his presence felt when he punched club legend Dave Mackay during training, though no long-term rift developed because of the incident. Spurs went on to have a good 1966–67 season though, finishing third in the league and beating Millwall (after a replay), Portsmouth, Bristol City, Birmingham City (after a replay) and Nottingham Forest to reach the 1967 FA Cup Final to face his former club Chelsea at Wembley Stadium. Spurs won the cup with a 2–1 victory, Jimmy Robertson and Frank Saul providing the goals before Bobby Tambling scored a late consolation goal for Chelsea. Ironically, earlier in the season Venables had bet £25 on Chelsea to win the cup at odds of 25/1, which would have paid out £500 if Spurs had lost the game, exactly the same figure as the £500 cup bonus he would receive for winning the match; in fact after tax deductions, Venables would have been better off financially if Chelsea had won.

Venables did not enjoy a great relationship with his manager, believing Bill Nicholson to have a negative attitude that drained him of enthusiasm. More significantly, he also felt that he was not appreciated by the Spurs fans. The club dropped to seventh and sixth-place finishes in 1967–68 and 1968–69 and Nicholson accepted an offer of £70,000 for Venables from Queens Park Rangers on 20 June 1969.

Queens Park Rangers
Venables later said that his transfer to Second Division QPR changed his life, and stated that "I cannot think of a transfer blessed with so much good fortune". Initially however, Rangers could only manage mid-table finishes in the 1969–70 and 1970–71 campaigns, with Venables scoring 18 goals in 83 games. Chairman Jim Gregory opted to sack Les Allen and appoint Gordon Jago as manager, who took Rangers up to fourth-place in 1971–72 – just two points behind promoted Birmingham City. Once coach Bobby Campbell departed Loftus Road for Arsenal, Jago allowed Venables to supervise the club's training sessions. Rangers continued to progress, and won promotion in 1972–73 after securing runners-up spot with an 11-point gap over third-place Aston Villa.

Crystal Palace
Venables signed with Crystal Palace in 1974; he and Ian Evans were traded to Palace in exchange for Don Rogers. He made 14 Third Division appearances in the 1974–75 season before retiring due to arthritis on New Year's Eve. Manager Malcolm Allison gave him a coaching role for the second half of the campaign.

International career
As well as receiving two international caps, Venables held the distinction of being the only footballer to play for England at schoolboy, youth, amateur, Under-23, and for the full international team; as the amateur team was disbanded in 1974 no player was ever able to match his record. He was named by Alf Ramsey on the list of 33 "possibles" for the 1966 FIFA World Cup, having won two caps in 1964 – a 2–2 draw with Belgium and a 1–1 draw with the Netherlands, but did not make it into the final squad of 22.

Managerial career

Crystal Palace
Venables worked as Malcolm Allison's coach for the 1975–76 season, when Palace reached the semi-finals of the FA Cup; however they lost the semi-final tie with Southampton and their subsequent league form suffered as they slipped back to fifth-place. Venables succeeded Allison as manager in June 1976. It proved to be a busy month for Venables, as he turned down the surprise offer to walk out on Palace to succeed Bertie Mee as Arsenal manager and also had a para-sailing accident in Majorca which required 40 stitches.

As Crystal Palace manager, Venables built a young team of mostly youth team players and free transfer signings which the media dubbed the "Team of the Eighties". Star winger Peter Taylor was sold on to Spurs for £200,000, but most of this sum went on balancing the club's books. Venables spent £1,500 to sign striker Rachid Harkouk from Feltham, coming up with half of this sum out of his own funds on the understanding that he would receive 50% of any future transfer fee for the player. By March 1977, the board found enough money for Venables to purchase Jeff Bourne from Derby County for £30,000, and Bourne ended the 1976–77 campaign with nine goals in 15 games to help Palace to secure the third and final automatic promotion place.

His team adjusted well to the Second Division and finished in ninth-place in 1977–78, before going on to win promotion as champions in 1978–79. They secured the title with a final day victory over Burnley in a rearranged fixture some days after all their promotion rivals had completed their fixtures; the win meant that they leapfrogged Brighton & Hove Albion, Stoke City and Sunderland, and they denied their M23 derby rivals from the south coast what would have been their club's highest honour.

His first season as a manager in the First Division, in the 1979–80 season, started successfully, and on 29 September, Crystal Palace were top of the English Football League for one week. They ended back down in 13th-place, which was at that time the club's highest ever league finish.

The following season started badly for Venables; expensive high-profile signings failed to gel, and by October 1980, Palace were bottom of the First Division, and in financial difficulties. Venables left during October to join Second Division Queens Park Rangers; although the exact reasons behind his sudden departure have never been made clear.

Queens Park Rangers
Venables left Palace, in the top division, for Queens Park Rangers, who were in the Second Division. His departure from Selhurst Park coincided with a decline in form for Palace, who were relegated at the end of the season and did not regain their top flight status for another eight years. Venables drew a number of players over to Queens Park Rangers which, as reported at the time, gave an additional financial boost to his personal earnings.

He took QPR back into the First Division as Second Division champions in 1983. He also guided Rangers to the FA Cup final in 1982 whilst still a Second Division side, but lost in a replay against his former club Tottenham.

His final season as QPR manager, 1983–84, brought more success as they finished fifth in the league (their highest finish since they were runners-up in 1976) and qualified for the UEFA Cup. Venables then moved to Spain to take over at Barcelona, while Alan Mullery took over from him at Loftus Road in an ill-fated arrangement that lasted just six months.

Barcelona
Venables gained a good reputation as a manager with his successes at Crystal Palace and QPR, and this attracted offers from some of Europe's most prestigious clubs. In 1984, Venables took the role of manager at Barcelona, earning the sobriquet "El Tel". He was recommended by Bobby Robson, a good friend of the Barcelona Vice-president and who himself, years later, would take over the team. Venables used a very English system, a classic 4–4–2, which took advantage of outstanding defenders like Gerardo, Migueli and Julio Alberto and a hard-working midfield led by West German Bernd Schuster. During his three seasons in Catalonia, Venables led the club to the Spanish league title in 1985 (their first since 1974). He also won the 1986 Copa de la Liga, and led them to the Copa del Rey final in 1986 losing to Real Zaragoza.

Barcelona also reached the 1986 European Cup Final, although they lost to Steaua București in a penalty shoot-out following a 0–0 draw. It was Barcelona's first appearance in a European Cup final since 1961 and had been achieved after one of the most dramatic European Cup semi-finals in the history of the competition. Venables's side overcame a 3–0 first-leg defeat to Swedish club IFK Göteborg, winning the second-leg of the 1986 semi-final at the Camp Nou in a penalty shoot-out after a 3–3 aggregate score.

Venables brought two British strikers to Barcelona in 1986 – Gary Lineker from Everton and Mark Hughes from Manchester United. Lineker was a great success at the Camp Nou, scoring 21 goals during his first season, including a hat-trick in a 3–2 win over Real Madrid. Lineker spent three years at Barcelona, until Venables brought him back to England with his new club Tottenham Hotspur in 1989. Hughes, however, was less successful and spent just one season in the Barcelona side, before being loaned to Bayern Munich.

Venables was dismissed by Barcelona in September 1987, after failing to repeat his title success at the Camp Nou and losing home and away to eventual finalists Dundee United in the quarter-finals of the UEFA Cup six months earlier.

Tottenham Hotspur
On 23 November 1987, he returned to England to manage Tottenham Hotspur. His success with the Spurs team was varied, with the side finishing in mid-table for most of his tenure, though they did win the FA Cup in 1991 and finished third in the league in 1990. Venables had brought both Gary Lineker and Paul Gascoigne to Spurs and was a favourite to replace Bobby Robson as England national football team manager when the job became vacant in 1990, but doubts about his probity led him to be passed over in favour of Graham Taylor. Venables did not even make it onto the shortlist of three managers selected by The Football Association.

After a failed £20m bid to take over Spurs with Larry Gillick, Venables was appointed chief executive by Alan Sugar, who had won the takeover battle against Robert Maxwell in June 1991. Over the next two seasons, the Spurs team was managed by Peter Shreeves and then the joint management team of Ray Clemence and Doug Livermore, with the final arrangement seeing Venables having more involvement with the first team. A clash of personalities developed and Sugar dismissed Venables on 14 May 1993, over his business dealings. After gaining a temporary injunction, he was reinstated, but lost a 3-day high court hearing and ordered to pay costs.

England
Venables was appointed manager of the England national team on 28 January 1994, having been recommended to the FA by Jimmy Armfield. However he came under intense scrutiny and censure in the media for his business dealings, which led MP Kate Hoey to state in Parliament that Venables was unfit for the post of national team manager. He appointed Don Howe and Mike Kelly as coaches and put Dave Sexton in charge of the England under-21 team. He took England to a second-place finish in the Umbro Cup in June 1995, but froze Paul Ince out of the international set-up after Ince declined to play in the tournament.

As England automatically qualified for UEFA Euro 1996 as hosts, he organised friendlies to allow him to experiment and find his best squad for the tournament, and particularly to find the best tactical system to suit the players. Venables decided to stand down at the end of Euro 1996 after the FA's International Committee chairman Noel White refused to grant Venables a contract extension in December 1995; the FA insisted on evaluating England's performances in competitive fixtures before deciding on his future. In May 1996, Glenn Hoddle was announced as his successor, meaning that Venables would have no choice but to stand down as manager no matter how well England performed at the tournament.

Having selected David Platt as captain during the friendly matches, Venables decided to appoint Tony Adams as captain for Euro 1996. He stood by his players in the face of media criticism before and during the tournament, which grew particularly intense after Paul Gascoigne and several others were photographed drunk in a nightclub during a team stay in Hong Kong; Venables went so far as to accuse some reporters as being "traitors" for what he described as a "witch-hunt" against England players. England went unbeaten throughout the competition, drawing with Switzerland in the opening group game before beating Scotland 2–0 and the Netherlands 4–1. After his retirement, Venables described the win over the Netherlands as "perfection – my most thrilling experience in football". England advanced past Spain in the quarter-finals with a victory on penalties, before being eliminated by Germany on penalties at the semi-finals following a 1–1 draw.

According to Alan Shearer, who played for Venables at Euro '96, "Terry's knowledge and tactical know-how were spot-on and he knew how to get the best out of us too. We responded to him, believed in him and played some outstanding football in that tournament." Another player in the squad, Gareth Southgate, said, "Terry opened my eyes to things that no one else has. He has fantastic tactical awareness. Every senior player in the group went away having learnt a lot from him, which is an achievement." On the Euro '96 team, Rob Smyth wrote in The Guardian, "Under the managership of Terry Venables, this was an admirably enlightened, flexible and relaxed England side, one for the modern age; they even played a genuine 3-5-2... against Scotland and Germany. But they still weren't actually that good." Smyth argued there were "only two decent performances" by England in the tournament, against Holland and Germany.

Australia
Venables became manager of Australia in November 1996, following the resignation of Eddie Thomson. In the 1997 Confederations Cup, Venables led Australia to the final before defeat to Brazil. His side swept through the Oceania World Cup qualifiers, but were beaten in a play-off by Iran on away goals. With the team having drawn 1–1 in Tehran, Australia led the second leg 2–0 early in the second half, but they conceded two late goals to miss out on qualification for the 1998 World Cup on away goals. Venables decided to quit the Socceroos as the National Governing Body had bank-rolled the Federation in the hope of reaching their first World Cup since 1974.

Return to Crystal Palace
In summer 1998, he returned to Crystal Palace who had just been taken over by Mark Goldberg. Venables left acrimoniously in January 1999, as the south-London club went into administration. His appointment had created a media frenzy, with Goldberg boasting that he was going to turn Palace into a European force within the next five years.  Venables missed the first competitive game in charge citing his busy schedule as a TV pundit for that summer's World Cup as his reason for needing a break from football.  Ultimately his first game in charge was the away leg of an InterToto Cup tie, with the club already 0-2 down from the home leg in his absence.  Venables chose to field youth and ultimately the adventure ended immediately.  After a spell of inconsistent results the Goldberg dream of building Palace as a force was over in January 1999 when  Venables was released as the club faced financial problems and narrowly avoided going out of business, although they did at least finish in a secure position in Division One.

Middlesbrough
Despite being linked with vacant managerial positions with Wales and Chelsea, Venables remained out of football for nearly two years until December 2000, when he was appointed Head Coach to assist and co-manage Middlesbrough with the incumbent manager Bryan Robson in a bid to help the club avoid relegation. The club eventually finished 14th and survived. However, Venables felt Teesside was too remote a base for his media and business interests and he left at the same time as Robson in June 2001.

Leeds United
In July 2002, Venables joined Leeds United as manager. Although the extent of Leeds' disastrous financial problems were only beginning to become clear with club captain Rio Ferdinand sold to Manchester United only a fortnight into Venables appointment, he still inherited a stronger squad than the one that had qualified for the UEFA Champions League two years earlier (effectively, since Ferdinand was bought after qualification.) Despite this, by December of that year the side had crashed out of both the League Cup and the UEFA Cup and were languishing in the bottom half of the table.

Leeds were further weakened in January 2003, when Jonathan Woodgate was sold to Newcastle United without Venables being informed, in an attempt to pay off mounting debts. Venables threatened to leave if Woodgate was sold, but was persuaded to stay by Peter Ridsdale. With the club spiralling towards relegation, and amid later substantiated rumours of further player sales by the board Venables was sacked in March 2003.

Later career
Venables was linked with Australian club Newcastle Jets in 2005, but his commitments in the UK prevented him from taking up a role within the club, and his agent announced that he did not sign any deal with the club. At the end of the 2005–06 season, he was linked with a return to Middlesbrough, but decided that at his age he would be unable to manage a Premier League club full-time. Later in the year, Venables returned to the England set-up as assistant to new manager Steve McClaren. He was later sacked from this role in November 2007, along with McClaren, after England failed to qualify for Euro 2008.

Since 2007, Venables has been linked in the media with many managerial vacancies, including those at the Republic of Ireland, Bulgaria, Queen's Park Rangers, Hull City, and Wales. In 2012, he was hired by non-League club Wembley as a technical adviser.

Public image and managerial style
According to Luke Ginnell, writing for football magazine FourFourTwo, Venables' career "arguably promised more than it delivered," and he was dubbed the "False Messiah" by sports writer Mihir Bose. The Times described Venables as a "wide boy with a history of trouble off the pitch". According to Richard Williams, "those who distrusted Venables were shouted down by those who had actually played under him, and who regard him—with rare unanimity—as possessing one of this country's very few exceptional football intellects." Writing for The Observer in 2004, Bill Borrows questioned why Venables, "who has won so little and failed at so much," was "considered by his peers to be 'synonymous with success'." Borrows wrote, "He has lost a couple of big games on penalties and even led Spurs to third in the League. But, in truth, his record isn't good enough, certainly when compared to the best managers, such as Brian Clough."

Venables described himself as a "players' man", who gave players freedom off the pitch and defended them if they were criticised in the media. He was reluctant to praise players during his half-time team talks so as to avoid complacency, and felt it was important to keep his words brief and the tone light-hearted so players could take on board key points and remain in good spirits for the second half.

Personal life

Terry married Christine McCann, a dressmaker, in 1966. They had two daughters before divorcing in 1984. He met his second wife Yvette Bazire in 1984, in his father's pub in Chingford, Greater London. She accompanied him to Barcelona when he was appointed as their manager and they married in 1991. She managed his Kensington dining club, Scribes West, for seven years. He sold it in 1997.

Business interests
One of his first business ventures was to open a tailors in the West End of London, along with Chelsea teammates George Graham and Ron 'Chopper' Harris; the business proved unsuccessful and eventually filed for bankruptcy.

On 14 January 1998 he was disqualified by the high court from acting as a company director for seven years under section 8 of the Company Directors Disqualification Act 1986 for mismanagement of four companies – Scribes West Ltd, Edenote plc, Tottenham Hotspur plc and Tottenham Hotspur Football and Athletic Company Ltd. The case was brought by the Department of Trade and Industry who cited instances of bribery, lying, deception, manipulation of accounts and taking money that should have been given to creditors. Re Tottenham Hotspur plc

Venables combined his duties with Australia for a period as consultant and then chairman at Portsmouth. He purchased a 51% controlling interest in the club for £1 in February 1997, but left in controversial circumstances 11 months later. His company Vencorp received a £300,000 bonus in the summer of 1997 and he is thought to have been paid around £250,000 upon leaving the club, but he left them bottom of Division One.

Although Portsmouth avoided relegation 1997–98, their financial situation worsened and they were in real danger of bankruptcy, until being taken over by Milan Mandarić in late 1999.

In 2014, together with his wife, Venables opened a boutique hotel and restaurant in Penàguila, in the Alicante region of Spain. It was sold in early 2019 when they decided to retire.

Other work (writing and singing)
Venables served the Professional Footballers' Association as vice-chairman in the 1970s, and represented QPR teammate Dave Thomas at his tribunal against Burnley chairman Bob Lord. He co-authored five novels with writer Gordon Williams: They Used to Play on Grass (1972), The Bornless Keeper (1974), Hazell Plays Solomon (1974), Hazell and the Three Card Trick (1975), and Hazell and the Menacing Jester (1976). He used the pseudonym "P.B. Yuill" after completing the first book as he felt critics dismissed his contribution to They Used to Play on Grass as a gimmick. They Used to Play on Grass was voted at #172 in the BBC's The Big Read survey in 2003. He is credited as co-creator of the ITV detective series Hazell. Having been a football pundit for BBC since the mid-80s, he left for ITV in 1994, following a legal dispute with the corporation over allegations made against him in a Panorama programme. In 1990, Venables co-devised the board game, "Terry Venables invites you to be... The Manager".

His parents were very good singers, and encouraged Venables to also take up singing. At the age of 17 he entered a singing competition at Butlins in Clacton-on-Sea, though Chelsea did not allow him to compete in the final stages. In 2002, he recorded a single for the World Cup together with the band Rider. "England Crazy" reached number 46 in the UK charts. In 2010, he recorded a cover of the Elvis Presley song "If I Can Dream" in association with British newspaper The Sun. It featured a 60-piece Royal Philharmonic Orchestra with Harry Redknapp and Ian Wright filmed at Wembley Stadium. The song reached number 23 in the UK charts on 13 June.

Career statistics
Source:

Managerial statistics

Honours

Player
Chelsea
Football League Cup: 1964–65
Football League Second Division runner-up: 1962–63

Tottenham Hotspur
FA Cup: 1966–67
FA Charity Shield: 1967 (shared)

Queens Park Rangers
Football League Second Division runner-up: 1972–73

Manager
Crystal Palace
Football League Second Division: 1978–79
Football League Third Division third-place promotion: 1976–77

Queens Park Rangers
Football League Second Division: 1982–83
FA Cup runner-up: 1981–82

Barcelona
La Liga: 1984–85
Copa de la Liga: 1986
European Cup runner-up: 1985–86

Tottenham Hotspur
FA Cup: 1990–91
FA Charity Shield: 1991 (shared)

Australia
FIFA Confederations Cup runner-up: 1997

Individual
Don Balón Award: 1985
English Football Hall of Fame: 1997 (inducted)
Premier League Manager of the Month: January 2001

References

Sources
 
 
 
 

1943 births
Living people
Footballers from Dagenham
English people of Welsh descent
English footballers
England schools international footballers
England youth international footballers
England amateur international footballers
England under-23 international footballers
England international footballers
Association football midfielders
Chelsea F.C. players
Tottenham Hotspur F.C. players
Queens Park Rangers F.C. players
English expatriate footballers
Expatriate soccer players in Australia
Crystal Palace F.C. players
Expatriate association footballers in the Republic of Ireland
St Patrick's Athletic F.C. players
English Football League players
English Football League representative players
League of Ireland players
English football managers
Crystal Palace F.C. managers
Queens Park Rangers F.C. managers
English expatriate football managers
Expatriate football managers in Spain
FC Barcelona managers
Tottenham Hotspur F.C. managers
England national football team managers
Expatriate soccer managers in Australia
Australia national soccer team managers
Middlesbrough F.C. managers
Leeds United F.C. managers
English Football League managers
La Liga managers
Premier League managers
UEFA Euro 1996 managers
1997 FIFA Confederations Cup managers
Queens Park Rangers F.C. non-playing staff
Crystal Palace F.C. non-playing staff
English chief executives
Tottenham Hotspur F.C. non-playing staff
Portsmouth F.C. non-playing staff
English football chairmen and investors
Portsmouth F.C. directors and chairmen
English Football Hall of Fame inductees
English male non-fiction writers
20th-century English writers
English autobiographers
English male singers
English expatriate sportspeople in Australia
English expatriate sportspeople in Ireland
English expatriate sportspeople in Spain
FA Cup Final players
Association football coaches